Hockey in the Netherlands may refer to:

Field hockey
 Field hockey in the Netherlands
 Netherlands men's national field hockey team
 Netherlands women's national field hockey team

Ice hockey
 Netherlands Ice Hockey Association
 Netherlands men's national ice hockey team
 Netherlands women's national ice hockey team